Kent Bostick (born June 27, 1953) is an American cyclist. He competed in the men's individual pursuit at the 1996 Summer Olympics.

References

External links
 

1953 births
Living people
American male cyclists
Olympic cyclists of the United States
Cyclists at the 1996 Summer Olympics
People from Corrales, New Mexico
Pan American Games medalists in cycling
Pan American Games gold medalists for the United States
Cyclists at the 1987 Pan American Games
Cyclists at the 1995 Pan American Games
Medalists at the 1995 Pan American Games